Yeh Khula Aasmaan is a 2012 Hindi-language film, directed by Gitanjali Sinha and produced by Hemendra Aran of Gitanjali Creations. The film stars Raghubir Yadav, Yashpal Sharma, Raj Tandon and Anya Anand. Anand–Milind composed the music for the film.

Plot 

Avinash, a young intelligent boy experiences an extremely challenging phase of life due to his academic failures. He feels an immense vacuum which unfortunately his busy parents are unable to fill. In desperation, he visits his grandfather Dadu after several years.

Being the best kite runner of his era, Dadu uses the 'kite' to subtly impart the lessons of life and prepares Avinash to face life.

The Movie is inspired by a True Story.

Cast 
Raghubir Yadav
Yashpal Sharma
Raj Tandon
Anya Anand
Manjusha Godse
Kishor Nadalskar
Nitin Kerur
Aditya Siddhu
Gulshan Pandey

Soundtrack

References

External links 
 
 
 Yeh Khula Aasmaan Official Trailer

2012 films
2010s Hindi-language films
Films scored by Anand–Milind
2012 directorial debut films